Acacia prainii, commonly known as Prain's wattle, is a shrub or tree belonging to the genus Acacia and the subgenus Phyllodineae endemic to Australia.

Description
It has angled branchlets with fine yellow ribs. It blooms from July to October and produces yellow flowers. The inflorescences appear on three to seven headed racemes, the showy spherical flower heads contain 10 to 24 light golden flowers.

Taxonomy
The species was first formally described by the botanist Joseph Maiden in 1917 as part of the Journal and Proceedings of the Royal Society of New South Wales. It was reclassified by Leslie Pedley in 2003 as Racosperma prainii then transferred back to the genus Acacia on 2006. Other synonyms include Acacia prolifera, Acacia prainii var. linearis, Acacia dentifera var. parvifolia and Acacia prainii Maiden var. prainii.

Distribution
It has a scattered distribution through an area in the northern and eastern Wheatbelt, Pilbara and Goldfields-Esperance regions of Western Australia where it grows in red sandy, loamy and stony soils. Its range extends into western South Australia and the Northern Territory where it is part of open mallee, Eucalyptus woodlands or spinifex communities.

See also
List of Acacia species

References

prainii
Acacias of Western Australia
Plants described in 1917
Flora of South Australia
Flora of the Northern Territory
Taxa named by Joseph Maiden